Qeshlaq-e Safar may refer to:
 Qeshlaq-e Safar Ali Ghib Ali
 Qeshlaq-e Safar Ali Nosrat